Bryan–College Station is a metropolitan area centering on the twin cities of Bryan and College Station in the Brazos Valley region of Texas.  The 2010 census placed the population of the three county metropolitan area at 255,519. The 2019 population estimate was 273,101. 

The area's economic and social life is centered on the main campus of Texas A&M University in College Station; thus, the area is popularly known as "Aggieland" in reference to the Aggies nickname for the university's sports teams and students.

Geography
The College Station–Bryan, TX metropolitan statistical area (MSA) encompasses three counties: Brazos, Burleson, and Robertson. The College Station–Bryan MSA encompasses 2,123 sq mi (5,524 km2) of area, of which 2,100 sq mi (5,439 km2) is land and 33.5 sq mi (87 km2) is water.

Counties
 Brazos
 Burleson
 Robertson

Communities

Places with more than 75,000 people
 Bryan
 College Station

Places with 1,000 to 10,000 people
 Caldwell
 Calvert
 Franklin
 Hearne
 Somerville
 Navasota

Places with fewer than 1,000 people
 Anderson
 Bremond
 Snook
 Kurten
 Millican
 Todd Mission
 Wixon Valley
 Iola
Bedias

Unincorporated places
 Benchley
 Chriesman
 Cooks Point
 Deanville
 Easterly
 Frenstat
 Hammond
 Lyons
 Mumford
 New Baden
 Ridge
 Tidwell Prairie
 Wheelock

Demographics 

As of the census of 2020, there were 268,248 people, 95,194 households, and 55,487 families residing within the MSA. The racial makeup of the MSA was 60.71% White (non-Hispanic White 53.61%), 10.63% African American, 0.69% Native American, 5.52% Asian, 0.09% Pacific Islander, 9.84% from other races, and 3.33% from two or more races. Hispanic or Latino of any race were 26.21% of the population.

The median income for a household in the MSA was $30,339 and the median income for a family was $40,442. Males had a median income of $30,818 versus $21,951 for females. The per capita income for the MSA was $15,847.

See also
 List of cities in Texas
 Texas census statistical areas
 List of Texas metropolitan areas
 Brazos Valley, the geographic region of Texas in which the area is located
 Texas Triangle

References

External links

 The City of College Station
 The City of Bryan
 Bryan/College Station Chamber of Commerce
 Bryan/College Station Convention and Visitors Bureau

 
Geography of Brazos County, Texas
Geography of Burleson County, Texas
Geography of Robertson County, Texas